The 173rd (Highlanders) Battalion, CEF, was a unit in the Canadian Expeditionary Force during the First World War.  One of a number of Highlander battalions in the Canadian Expeditionary Force, it was based in Hamilton, Ontario, and began recruiting during the winter of 1915/16.

Of the 950 other ranks, 741 had attested with the 173rd, 145 with the 213rd Battalion, CEF, and 32 with 23 different units.

On January 17, 1917, the 173rd arrived at Bramshott where on January 19 it became part of the 2nd Reserve Battalion of the 6th Reserve Brigade.  The 2nd Reserve Battalion was designated to supply drafts for the 125th and 116th Battalions, CEF.  The 173rd (Highlanders) Battalion had one Officer Commanding: Lieut-Col. W. H. Bruce.

The battalion has been perpetuated by the Argyll and Sutherland Highlanders of Canada since 1920.

See also

List of infantry battalions in the Canadian Expeditionary Force
 The Canadian Crown and the Canadian Forces
 Military history of Canada
 History of the Canadian Army
 Canadian Forces

References

External links

Military units and formations established in 1915
1915 establishments in Ontario
Battalions of the Canadian Expeditionary Force
Military units and formations of Ontario
Argyll and Sutherland Highlanders of Canada (Princess Louise's)